Oppolzer is a surname of  Austrian origin. Most people with the surname Oppolzer have their ancestors 
in a small region in Southern Bohemia, which was Austrian in former times, but belongs to the Czech Republic today.
There is also a small village with an old fort called Oppolz (Czech name Tycha) in this region. 

Famous Oppolzers are 

 Johann Ritter von Oppolzer, Austrian physician, father of Theodor, born in Nove Hrady, Southern Bohemia 
 Theodor von Oppolzer, Austrian astronomer, born in Prague

Both Johann and Theodor lived and worked in Vienna most of the time of their lives. 

There is a lunar crater called Oppolzer, and an asteroid.
Both are named after Theodor.

References

German-language surnames